Ice hockey at the 2015 Winter Universiade was held from February 3 through February 14 at the Granada Sport Palace and the nearby Mulhacen Pavilion in Granada. In most cases, men's matches were played at the Granada Sport Palace and women's matches were played at the Mulhacen Pavilion, although exceptions were made for the women's semifinals and medal games played in the larger Granada Sport Palace, while some lower men's placement games and one quarterfinal were played at the Mulhacen Pavilion. The draw to place the teams - 11 in the men's tournament and seven in the women's tournament, including the hosting Spain sides in both cases - into their assigned pools took place on September 25, 2014.

Venues

Men

Preliminary round
Eleven participating teams were placed in the following three groups. After playing a round-robin within the group, the teams ranked 6th to 11th overall had to play and win a qualification game to advance to the quarterfinals, while the teams ranked 1st through 5th overall advanced directly to the quarterfinals.

Teams received 3 points for a regulation win, 2 points for an overtime/shootout win and 1 point for an overtime/shootout loss. They were then seeded for the playoff round by points per game played, then by goal differential.

All game box scores via wuni15.sportresult.com.

Group A 

All times are local (UTC+1).

Group B 

All times are local (UTC+1).

Group C 

All times are local (UTC+1).

Playoff round

* denotes shootout victory

All times are local (UTC+1).

Qualification

9th–11th placement round

Quarterfinals

5th–8th placement matches

7th place match

5th place match

Semifinals

Bronze medal match

Gold medal match

Final standings

Scoring leaders
List shows the top skaters sorted by points, then goals.

GP = Games played; G = Goals; A = Assists; Pts = Points; +/− = Plus/minus; PIM = Penalties in minutes; POS = Position
Source: granada2015.org

Leading goaltenders
Only the top five goaltenders, based on save percentage, who have played at least 40% of their team's minutes, are included in this list.

TOI = Time on Ice (minutes:seconds); SA = Shots against; GA = Goals against; GAA = Goals against average; Sv% = Save percentage; SO = Shutouts
Source: granada2015.org

Women

Preliminary round

Seven participating teams were placed in the following two groups. After playing a round-robin, the teams ranked first and second in each group advanced to the semifinals.

Teams received 3 points for a regulation win, 2 points for an overtime/shootout win and 1 point for an overtime/shootout loss.

All game box scores via wuni15.sportresult.com.

Group A

All times are local (UTC+1).

Group B

All times are local (UTC+1).

5th–7th placement round

All times are local (UTC+1).

Playoff round

All times are local (UTC+1).

Semifinals

Bronze medal match

Gold medal match

Final standings

Scoring leaders
List shows the top skaters sorted by points, then goals.

GP = Games played; G = Goals; A = Assists; Pts = Points; +/− = Plus/minus; PIM = Penalties in minutes; POS = Position
Source: granada2015.org

Leading goaltenders
Only the top six goaltenders, based on save percentage, who have played at least 40% of their team's minutes, are included in this list.

TOI = Time on Ice (minutes:seconds); SA = Shots against; GA = Goals against; GAA = Goals against average; Sv% = Save percentage; SO = Shutouts
Source: granada2015.org

Medalists

Medal table

References

External links
Results book

Ice Hockey
2015
2015
Winter Universiade